The 2021 United Kingdom elections were several elections that took place in the United Kingdom on 6 May 2021 at the subnational and local levels. They have been colloquially referred to as Super Thursday. The elections that took place on this day are:

 2021 Scottish Parliament election
 2021 Senedd election
 2021 Hartlepool by-election (for UK Parliament)
 2021 United Kingdom local elections
 2021 London mayoral election
 2021 London Assembly election
 2021 England and Wales police and crime commissioner elections